Meleka is the former stage name for the English singer and songwriter Malika Ferguson.

Biography
Born Malika Ferguson, she created the pseudonym Meleka when working in the background, writing songs for other producers and artists. As Meleka, she was the featured vocalist on the funky house anthem "Go" with Crazy Cousinz in 2010.

She now performs as Malika and since "Go" she has released several songs, including her debut EP, Songs About C.

She performed uncredited vocals on the 2019 version of "Flowers" by Nathan Dawe which reached No. 12 in the UK.

References

1989 births
Living people
21st-century Black British women singers
Singers from London